Roseburg is an unincorporated community in Franklin Township, Grant County, Indiana.

A post office was established as Roseburgh in 1854, and remained in operation until it was discontinued in 1902.

Geography

References

Unincorporated communities in Grant County, Indiana
Unincorporated communities in Indiana